Levitzky is a surname. Notable people with the surname include:

 Dmitry Levitzky (1735–1822), painter
 Károly Levitzky (1885–1978), rower

See also
 Levitsky

Levite surnames
Slavic-language surnames
Jewish surnames
Yiddish-language surnames